Woodstock Township may refer to the following places:

 Woodstock Township, Schuyler County, Illinois
 Woolstock Township, Wright County, Iowa
 Woodstock Township, Lenawee County, Michigan

See also

Woodstock (disambiguation)

Township name disambiguation pages